Henry Arthur Callis (January 14, 1887 – November 12, 1974) was a physician and one of the seven founders (commonly referred to as The Seven Jewels) of Alpha Phi Alpha fraternity at Cornell University in 1906. Callis co-authored the fraternity name with George Kelley and became the only Jewel to become General President of the fraternity (1915). Callis assisted in the organization of several chapters, including Xi Lambda Chapter (1924) in Chicago.

Biography
Callis was born in Rochester, New York and attended Cornell University and Rush Medical College. He became a physician and worked as a medical consultant at the Veterans' Hospital in Tuskegee, Alabama. He was Professor of Medicine at Howard University and a frequent contributor to medical journals.

The Eta Tau Lambda chapter of Alpha Phi Alpha created Alpha Phi Alpha Homes Inc. to address housing for low-income families, individuals and senior citizens in Akron, Ohio. In 1971, Alpha Homes received an $11.5 million grant from HUD to begin groundbreaking on Channelwood Village with the Henry Arthur Callis Tower as its centerpiece.

Callis died on November 12, 1974 in Washington, D.C. His death was a milestone for the fraternity as Callis became the last Jewel to enter its Omega Chapter—distinguished to contain the names of deceased fraternity members, and the Alpha Phi Alpha entered a period when it had no living "Jewels". The Callis Papers - personal and family papers of Henry Callis including awards, certificates, clippings, correspondence, a diary, notebooks, photographs, programs and scrapbooks relating to Callis and his family - were donated to Howard University's Moorland-Spingarn Research Center.

Personal life
Callis was the second husband of poet Alice Dunbar; their marriage ended in divorce.

References

Further reading
 Charles H. Wesley Henry Arthur Callis, Life and Legacy (1977)

External links 
 Alpha Phi Alpha website
 Alpha Phi Alpha Homes
 Notable Members of Theta Chapter
 Xi Lambda Alumni Chapter, Chicago, Illinois

	

1887 births
1974 deaths
Alpha Phi Alpha founders
Alpha Phi Alpha presidents
Cornell University alumni
Physicians from Alabama
Rush Medical College alumni
Physicians from Rochester, New York